Frunevetmab, sold under the brand name Solensia, is a medication used to treat pain associated with osteoarthritis in cats.

The most common side effects seen in cats include vomiting, diarrhea, injection site pain, scabbing on the head and neck, dermatitis and pruritus (itchy skin).

Frunevetmab is a cat-specific monoclonal antibody (a type of protein) designed to recognize and attach to a protein called nerve growth factor (NGF) that is involved in the regulation of pain. When frunevetmab binds to NGF, it prevents the pain signal from reaching the brain.

Frunevetmab was approved for medical use in the European Union in February 2021, and in the United States in January 2022. It is the first monoclonal antibody new animal drug approved by the U.S. Food and Drug Administration (FDA) for use in any animal species.

Medical uses 
Frunevetmab is indicated for the alleviation of pain associated with osteoarthritis in cats.

Society and culture

Names 
Frunevetmab is the international nonproprietary name (INN).

References

Further reading

External links 
 

Monoclonal antibodies
Cat medications